Snake worship is devotion to serpent deities. The tradition is present in several ancient cultures, particularly in religion and mythology, where snakes were seen as the holders of knowledge, strength, and renewal.

Near East

Ancient Mesopotamia
Ancient Mesopotamians and Semites believed that snakes were immortal because they could infinitely shed their skin and appear forever youthful, appearing in a fresh guise every time. The Sumerians worshipped a serpent god named Ningishzida. Before the arrival of the Israelites, snake cults were well established in Canaan in the Bronze Age, for archaeologists have uncovered serpent cult objects in Bronze Age strata at several pre-Israelite cities in Canaan: two at Megiddo, one at Gezer, one in the sanctum sanctorum of the Area H temple at Hazor, and two at Shechem.

In the surrounding region, serpent cult objects figured in other cultures. A late Bronze Age Hittite shrine in northern Syria contained a bronze statue of a god holding a serpent in one hand and a staff in the other. In sixth-century Babylon a pair of bronze serpents flanked each of the four doorways of the temple of Esagila. At the Babylonian New Year's festival, the priest was to commission from a woodworker, a metalworker, and a goldsmith two images, one of which "shall hold in its left hand a snake of cedar, raising its right [hand] to the god Nabu". At the tell of Tepe Gawra, at least seventeen Early Bronze Age Assyrian bronze serpents were recovered.<ref>E.A. Speiser, Excavations at Tepe Gawra: I. Levels I-VIII, p. 114ff., noted in Joines 1968:246 and note 9.</ref>

 United Arab Emirates 
Significant finds of pottery, bronze-ware and even gold depictions of snakes have been made throughout the United Arab Emirates (UAE). The Bronze Age and Iron Age metallurgical centre of Saruq Al Hadid has yielded probably the richest trove of such objects, although finds have been made bearing snake symbols in Bronze Age sites at Rumailah, Bithnah and Masafi. Most of the depictions of snakes are similar, with a consistent dotted decoration applied to them.

Although the widespread depiction of snakes in sites across the UAE is thought by archaeologists to have a religious purpose, this remains conjecture.

Judaism

Gnosticism

Gnosticism originated in the late 1st century CE in non-rabbinical Jewish and early Christian sects. In the formation of Christianity, various sectarian groups, labeled "gnostics" by their opponents, emphasised spiritual knowledge (gnosis) of the divine spark within, over faith (pistis) in the teachings and traditions of the various communities of Christians. Gnosticism presents a distinction between the highest, unknowable God, and the Demiurge, "creator" of the material universe. The Gnostics considered the most essential part of the process of salvation to be this personal knowledge, in contrast to faith as an outlook in their worldview along with faith in the ecclesiastical authority.

In Gnosticism, the biblical serpent in the Garden of Eden was praised and thanked for bringing knowledge (gnosis) to Adam and Eve and thereby freeing them from the malevolent Demiurge's control. Gnostic Christian doctrines rely on a dualistic cosmology that implies the eternal conflict between good and evil, and a conception of the serpent as the liberating savior and bestower of knowledge to humankind opposed to the Demiurge or creator god, identified with the Hebrew God of the Old Testament. Gnostic Christians considered the Hebrew God of the Old Testament as the evil, false god and creator of the material universe, and the Unknown God of the Gospel, the father of Jesus Christ and creator of the spiritual world, as the true, good God. In the Archontic, Sethian, and Ophite systems, Yaldabaoth (Yahweh) is regarded as the malevolent Demiurge and false god of the Old Testament who generated the material universe and keeps the souls trapped in physical bodies, imprisoned in the world full of pain and suffering that he created.

However, not all Gnostic movements regarded the creator of the material universe as inherently evil or malevolent. For instance, Valentinians believed that the Demiurge is merely an ignorant and incompetent creator, trying to fashion the world as good as he can, but lacking the proper power to maintain its goodness. They were regarded as heretics by the proto-orthodox Early Church Fathers.

Africa

 Danh-gbi 
In Africa, one centre of serpent worship was the Kingdom of Dahomey (in present-day Benin), but the cult of this python seems to have been of exotic origin, introduced c. 1725 from the Kingdom of Whydah around the time of its conquest by Dahomey. This was the cult of the serpent deity called the Danh-gbi or Dangbe, who was a benefactor-god of wisdom and bliss, "associated with trees and the ocean".

At Whydah, the chief centre, there is a serpent temple, tenanted by some fifty snakes. A killing of a python, even by accident, was punishable by death, but by the 19th century this was replaced by a fine.

Danh-gbi has numerous wives, who until 1857 took part in a public procession from which the profane crowd was excluded; and those who peeked were punishable by death. A python was carried around the town in a hammock, perhaps as a ceremony for the expulsion of evils.

 Rainbow Snake 

The Rainbow Snake was called the Aido Hwedo, a sort of cosmic serpent which could cause quakes and floods and even controlled the motions of heavenly bodies. The rainbow-god of the Ashanti was also conceived to have the form of a snake. His messenger was said to be a small variety of boa, but only certain individuals, not the whole species, were sacred.
In West African mythology in general, Ayida-Weddo is believed to hold up the sky.Neil Philip (1999), page 6, Myths and Legends Explained, Dorling Kindersley .

 African diasporic religion 
The belief has spread to the New World. In Haitian Vodou, the creator loa Damballa is represented as a serpent, and his wife Ayida-Weddo being the rainbow serpent.  Simbi are a type of serpentine loa in Haitian Vodou. They are associated with water and sometimes are believed to act as psychopomps serving Papa Legba.

 Example in art 
Eva Meyerowitz wrote of an earthenware pot that was stored at the Museum of Achimota College in present-day Ghana. The base of the neck of this pot is surrounded by the rainbow snake. The legend of this creature explains that the rainbow snake only emerged from its home when it was thirsty. Keeping its tail on the ground the snake would raise its head to the sky looking for the rain god. As it drank great quantities of water, the snake would spill some which would fall to the earth as rain.

There are four other snakes on the sides of this pot: Danh-gbi, the life giving snake, Li, for protection, Liwui, which was associated with Wu, god of the sea, and Fa, the messenger of the gods. The first three snakes Danh-gbi, Li, Liwui were all worshipped at Whydah, Dahomey where the serpent cult originated. For the Dahomeans, the spirit of the serpent was one to be feared as he was unforgiving. They believed that the serpent spirit could manifest itself in any long, winding objects such as plant roots and animal nerves. They also believed it could manifest itself as the umbilical cord, making it a symbol of fertility and life.

 Mami Wata 

Mami Wata is a water spirit or class of spirits associated with fertility and healing, usually depicted as a woman holding a large snake or with the lower body of a serpent or fish. She is worshipped in West, Central, and Southern Africa and the African diaspora.

Ancient Egypt
Ancient Egyptians worshipped snakes, especially the cobra. The cobra was not only associated with the sun god Ra, but also many other deities such as Wadjet, Renenutet, Nehebkau, and Meretseger.

Serpents could also be evil and harmful such as the case of Apep. The serpent goddess Meretseger is regarded ambivalently with both veneration and fear.

Charms against snakes were inscribed or chanted, sometimes even to protect the dead; There are known charms against snakes that invoke the snake deity Nehebkau.

Wadjet was the patron goddess of Upper Egypt, and was represented as a cobra with spread hood, or a cobra-headed woman. She later became one of the protective emblems on the pharaoh's crown once Upper and Lower Egypt were united. She was said to 'spit fire' at the pharaoh's enemies, and the enemies of Ra. Sometimes referred to as one of the eyes of Ra, she was often associated with the lioness goddess Sekhmet, who also bore that role.

 Social and family affiliations 
In many parts of Africa, the serpent is looked upon as the incarnation of deceased relatives. Among the Amazulu, as among the Betsileo of Madagascar, certain species are assigned as the abode of certain classes. The Maasai, on the other hand, regard each species as the habitat of a particular family of the tribe.

The Americas
North America
Indigenous peoples of the Americas such as the Hopi give reverence to the rattlesnake as grandfather and king of snakes who is able to give fair winds or cause tempest. Among the Hopi of Arizona, snake-handling figures largely in a dance to celebrate the union of Snake Youth (a Sky spirit) and Snake Girl (an Underworld spirit). The rattlesnake was worshipped in the Natchez temple of the sun.

Mesoamerica

The Maya deity Kukulkan and the Aztec Quetzalcoatl (both meaning "feathered serpent") figured prominently in their respective cultures of origin. Kukulkan (Q'uq'umatz in K'iche' Maya) is associated with Vision Serpent iconography in Maya art. Kukulkan was an official state deity of Itza in the northern Yucatan.

The worship of Quetzalcoatl dates back to as early as the 1st century BC at Teotihuacan. In the Postclassic period (AD 900–1519), the cult was centered at Cholula. Quetzalcoatl was associated with wind, the dawn, the planet Venus as the morning star, and was a tutelary patron of arts, crafts, merchants, and the priesthood.

South America

Serpents figure prominently in the art of the pre-Incan Chavín culture, as can be seen at the type-site of Chavín de Huántar in Peru. In Chile the Mapuche mythology featured a serpent figure in stories about a deluge.

Asia

Cambodia
Serpents, or nāgas, play a particularly important role in Cambodian mythology.  A well-known story explains the emergence of the Khmer people from the union of Indian and indigenous elements, the latter being represented as nāgas.  According to the story, an Indian brahmana named Kaundinya came to Cambodia, which at the time was under the dominion of the naga king.  The naga princess Soma sallied forth to fight against the invader but was defeated.  Presented with the option of marrying the victorious Kaundinya, Soma readily agreed to do so, and together they ruled the land.  The Khmer people are their descendants.

India

Snakes, nagas, have high status in Hindu mythology.  (Sanskrit:नाग) is the Sanskrit and Pāli word for a deity or class of entity or being, taking the form of a very large snake, found in Hinduism and Buddhism. The use of the term nāga is often ambiguous, as the word may also refer, in similar contexts, to one of several human tribes known as or nicknamed Nāgas; to elephants; and to ordinary snakes, particularly the Ophiophagus hannah, the Ptyas mucosa and the Naja naja, the latter of which is still called nāg in Hindi and other languages of India. A female nāga is a nāgīn. The snake primarily represents rebirth, death and mortality, due to its casting of its skin and being symbolically "reborn". Over a large part of India, there are carved representations of cobras or nagas or stones as substitutes. To these human food and flowers are offered and lights are burned before the shrines. Among some Indians, a cobra which is accidentally killed is burned like a human being; no one would kill one intentionally. The serpent-god's image is carried in an annual procession by a celibate priestess.

At one time there were many prevalent different renditions of the serpent cult located in India. In Northern India, a masculine version of the serpent named Rivaan and known as the "king of the serpents" was worshipped. Instead of the "king of the serpents", actual live snakes were worshipped in Southern India

(Bhattacharyya 1965, p. 1). The Manasa-cult in Bengal, India, however, was dedicated to the anthropomorphic serpent goddess, Manasa (Bhattacharyya 1965, p. 1).

Nāgas form an important part of Hindu mythology. They play prominent roles in various legends:
 Shesha (Aadi shesha, Anantha) on whom Vishnu does yoga nidra (Anantha shayana).
 Vasuki is the king of Nagas.
 Kaliya poisoned the Yamuna river where he lived. Krishna subdued Kaliya and compelled him to leave the river.
 Manasa is the queen of the snakes.
 Astika is half Brahmin and half naga.
 A snake is commonly depicted around Shiva's neck.
 Patanjali the great sage and author of the Yoga Sutras was said to be the embodiment of Adi Shesha, the divine serpent who forms Vishu's couch. It was rumored he transformed into a giant snake while teaching his students from behind a screen. 
 Nag panchami is an important Hindu festival associated with snake worship which takes place on the fifth day of Shravana (July–August). Snake idols are offered gifts of milk and incense to help the worshipper to gain knowledge, wealth, and fame.

Different districts of Bengal celebrate the serpent in various ways. In the districts of East Mymensingh, West Sylhet, and North Tippera, serpent-worship rituals were very similar, however (Bhattacharyya 1965, p. 5). On the very last day of the Bengali month Shravana, all of these districts celebrate serpent-worship each year (Bhattacharyya 1965, p. 5). Regardless of their class and station, every family during this time created a clay model of the serpent-deity – usually the serpent-goddess with two snakes spreading their hoods on her shoulders. The people worshipped this model at their homes and sacrificed a goat or a pigeon for the deity's honor (Bhattacharyya 1965, p. 5). Before the clay goddess was submerged in water at the end of the festival, the clay snakes were taken from her shoulders. The people believed that the earth these snakes were made from cured illnesses, especially children's diseases (Bhattacharyya 1965, p. 6).

These districts also worshipped an object known as a Karandi (Bhattacharyya 1965, p. 6). Resembling a small house made of cork, the Karandi is decorated with images of snakes, the snake goddess, and snake legends on its walls and roof (Bhattacharyya 1965, p. 6). The blood of sacrificed animals was sprinkled on the Karandi and it also was submerged in the river at the end of the festival (Bhattacharyya 1965, p. 6).

Among the Khasi tribe of Meghalaya, there exists a legend of snake worshipping. The snake deity is called "U Thlen" (lit: Python or large serpent) and it is said to demand human sacrifice from his worshippers. Those who can provide the Thlen with human blood, are usually rewarded with riches, but he would shame those who cannot provide the needed sacrifice. The subject of the Thlen is still a sensitive subject among the Khasis, and in recent years, in some rural areas, people have been killed in the name of being "Nongshohnoh" or Keepers of the Thlen, the evil snake God.

As kul devata also nagas are worship at many parts of India including Madhya Pradesh and Gujarat. In Madhya Pradesh a village Sironja Gadariya in KATNI District people worship naga as a god of their ancestry. They are mainly brahman who worship Shiva also. They are descendants of bharadwaj saga and using Surname Dwivedi. In this village people are worship naga dev in every ceremony like birth, marriage, and any other small and special events. They also claim that even a real serpent mostly cobra living with them but never harm anyone. They consider that they are their ancestors who are cursed due to some wrong deeds. Also, when one dreams of snakes, it is associated with the ancestors and sometimes Lord Shiva in Hindusim.

Finally, another tradition in Hindu culture relating to yoga brings up kundalini, a type of spiritual energy said to sit at the base of the human spine. The term means "coiled snake" in Sanskrit roots and several goddesses are associated with its vitality, including Adi Parashakti and Bhairavi.

 China 
Eight dragon kings who assembled at the gathering where Shakyamuni preached the Lotus Sutra, as described in the sutra. Kumarajiva's translation of the Lotus Sutra refers to them by their Sanskrit names: Nanda, Upananda, Sagara, Vasuki, Takshaka, Anavatapta, Manasvin, and Utpalaka. According to the "Introduction" (first) chapter of the Lotus Sutra, each attends the gathering accompanied by several hundreds of thousands of followers.

 Korea 
In Korean mythology, Eobshin, the wealth goddess, appears as an eared, black snake. Chilseongshin (the Jeju Island equivalent to Eobshin) and her seven daughters are all snakes. These goddesses are deities of orchards, courts, and protect the home. According to the Jeju Pungtorok, "The people fear snakes. They worship it as a god...When they see a snake, they call it a great god, and do not kill it or chase it away." The reason for snakes symbolizing worth was because they ate rats and other pests.

 Japan 
Miwa deity

A major serpent deity in Japanese mythology is the god of Mount Miwa, i.e. Ōmononushi, and the shrine dedicated to it (Ōmiwa Jinja) is active and venerated to the present-day. According to the mythology, this serpent deity assumes human form and visits women, begetting offspring. Another wife, committed suicide with chopstick[s] after learning her husband was of serpent-form ("Legend of Hashihaka (Grave of Chopstick[s])").

Some versions of the legend of Matsura Sayohime(var.

Orochi

The term  means literally "giant snake", the well-known example being the Yamata no orochi, the eight-forked giant serpent. This monster that devoured maidens in Izumo Province was also a deity, and addressed as such by the hero-god  Susanoo who defeated the snake.

It has been assumed that in more real terms, an annual offering of "human sacrifice" was being made to the serpent deity, a god of field and fertility, bestowing "fertility of crops and the productivity of man and cattle", or in terms of the specific rice crop, orochi was perhaps a "god of the river" which controlled the influx of irrigation water to the rice field.

Whether "human sacrifice" in this case meant actually putting the maiden to death is a subject of debate and controversy. It has been asserted human offerings (to the river god) were nonexistent in Japan, or that human offerings to the field deity were never widespread.

In the Yamata-no-orochi episode, mythologist  hypothesized that the involved ritual was not an actual homicidal sacrifice of a maiden, but the appointment of a miko shamaness serving the snake deity, which would be a lifelong position.

Europe

Old Prussia
A snake was kept and fed with milk during rites dedicated to Potrimpus, a Prussian god.

Ancient Rome
In Italy, the Marsian goddess Angitia, whose name derives from the word for "serpent," was associated with witches, snakes, and snake-charmers. Angitia is believed to have also been a goddess of healing. Her worship was centered in the Central Apennine region.

On the Iberian Peninsula there is evidence that before the introduction of Christianity, and perhaps more strongly before Roman invasions, serpent worship was a standout feature of local religions (see Sugaar). To this day there are numerous traces in European popular belief, especially in Germany, of respect for the snake, possibly a survival of ancestor worship: The "house snake" cares for the cows and the children, and its appearance is an omen of death; and the lives of a pair of house snakes are often held to be bound with that of the master and the mistress. Tradition states that one of the Gnostic sects known as the Ophites caused a tame serpent to coil around the sacramental bread, and worshipped it as the representative of the Savior.
In Lanuvium (32 km from Rome) a big snake was venerated as a god and they offered human sacrifice to it.

Ancient Greece

Serpents figured prominently in archaic Greek myths. According to some sources, Ophion ("serpent", a.k.a. Ophioneus), ruled the world with Eurynome before the two of them were cast down by Kronos and Rhea. The oracles of the ancient Greeks were said to have been the continuation of the tradition begun with the worship of the Egyptian cobra goddess, Wadjet. We learn from Herodotus of a great serpent which defended the citadel of Athens. 

The Minoan Snake Goddess brandished a serpent in either hand, perhaps evoking her role as a source of wisdom, rather than her role as Mistress of the Animals (Potnia Theron), with a leopard under each arm.  It is not by accident that later the infant Herakles, a liminal hero on the threshold between the old ways and the new Olympian world, also brandished the two serpents that "threatened" him in his cradle. Although the Classical Greeks were clear that these snakes represented a threat, the snake-brandishing gesture of Herakles is the same as that of the Cretan goddess.

Typhon, the enemy of the Olympian gods, is described as a vast grisly monster with a hundred heads and a hundred serpents issuing from his thighs, who was conquered and cast into Tartarus by Zeus, or confined beneath volcanic regions, where he is the cause of eruptions. Typhon is thus the chthonic figuration of volcanic forces. Amongst his children by Echidna are Cerberus (a monstrous three-headed dog with a snake for a tail and a serpentine mane), the serpent-tailed Chimaera, the serpent-like water beast Hydra, and the hundred-headed serpentine dragon Ladon. Both the Lernaean Hydra and Ladon were slain by Herakles.

Python, an enemy of Apollo, was always represented in vase-paintings and by sculptors as a serpent. Apollo slew Python and made her former home, Delphi, his own oracle. The Pythia took her title from the name Python.

Amphisbaena, a Greek word, from amphis, meaning "both ways", and bainein, meaning "to go", also called the "Mother of Ants", is a mythological, ant-eating serpent with a head at each end. According to Greek mythology, the mythological amphisbaena was spawned from the blood that dripped from Medusa the Gorgon's head as Perseus flew over the Libyan Desert with her head in his hand.

Medusa and the other Gorgons were vicious female monsters with sharp fangs and hair of living, venomous snakes whose origins predate the written myths of Greece and who were the protectors of the most ancient ritual secrets. The Gorgons wore a belt of two intertwined serpents in the same configuration of the caduceus. The Gorgon was placed at the highest point and central of the relief on the Parthenon.

Asclepius, the son of Apollo and Koronis, learned the secrets of keeping death at bay after observing one serpent bringing another (which Asclepius himself had fatally wounded) healing herbs. To prevent the entire human race from becoming immortal under Asclepius's care, Zeus killed him with a bolt of lightning. Asclepius' death at the hands of Zeus illustrates man's inability to challenge the natural order that separates mortal men from the gods. In honor of Asclepius, snakes were often used in healing rituals. Non-venomous Aesculapian snakes were left to crawl on the floor in dormitories where the sick and injured slept. The author of the Bibliotheca claimed that Athena gave Asclepius a vial of blood from the Gorgons. Gorgon blood had magical properties: if taken from the left side of the Gorgon, it was a fatal poison; from the right side, the blood was capable of bringing the dead back to life. However Euripides wrote in his tragedy Ion that the Athenian queen Creusa had inherited this vial from her ancestor Erichthonios, who was a snake himself. In this version the blood of Medusa had the healing power while the lethal poison originated from Medusa's serpents. Zeus placed Asclepius in the sky as the constellation Ophiucus, "the Serpent-Bearer". The modern symbol of medicine is the rod of Asclepius, a snake twining around a staff, while the symbol of pharmacy is the bowl of Hygieia, a snake twining around a cup or bowl. Hygieia was a daughter of Asclepius.

Olympias, the mother of Alexander the Great and a princess of the primitive land of Epirus, had the reputation of a snake-handler, and it was in serpent form that Zeus was said to have fathered Alexander upon her; tame snakes were still to be found at Macedonian Pella in the 2nd century AD (Lucian, Alexander the false prophet'') and at Ostia a bas-relief shows paired coiled serpents flanking a dressed altar, symbols or embodiments of the Lares of the household, worthy of veneration (Veyne 1987 illus p 211).

Celtic religion
Among other things, the Celtic goddess Brigid was said to be associated with serpents. Her festival day, Imbolc, is traditionally a time for weather prognostication based on watching to see if serpents or badgers came from their winter dens, which may be a forerunner of the North American Groundhog Day. A Scottish Gaelic proverb about the day is:

Images

Explanatory notes

References
Citations

Bibliography

External links

 "Legendary Snakes", Indian Times—Spirituality, December 9, 2004
 "Snake Worship"
Entheogens and snake lore
Mannarasala Snake Temple

 
Snakes in religion
Animals in Buddhism

km:នាគខ្មែរ និង នាគសាសនា